Cloudburst, in comics, may refer to:

 Cloudburst, a member of the DC Comics team the Extremists
 Cloudburst (Image Comics), an Image Comics graphic novel written by Jimmy Palmiotti and Justin Gray
 Cloudburst (G.I. Joe), a fictional character in the G.I. Joe universe who has appeared in the comic book adaptations
 Cloudburst (Transformers), an Autobot Transformer who has appeared in the comic book adaptations

See also
Cloudburst (disambiguation)